The Bahamas Airline Pilots Association is a trade union in the Bahamas.

See also

 List of trade unions

External links
 Caribbean Airline Pilots Association
 International Federation of Air Line Pilots' Associations

Trade unions in the Bahamas
International Federation of Air Line Pilots' Associations
Airline pilots' trade unions